Phillip (Phill) Thomas Hawkins FRS (born 5 October 1958) is a molecular biologist, senior group leader at the Babraham Institute.

Phill Hawkins has contributed much to the understanding of inositol lipids functions in eukaryotic cells. Together with his long-time collaborator Leonard R Stephens, he established that PtdIns(4,5)P2 is the main substrate of receptor-controlled Type 1 phosphoinositide 3-kinases (PI3Ks), thus identifying PtdIns(3,4,5)P3 as the key output signal produced by this enzyme.
They identified and isolated the GPCR-activated Type 1B PI3K (PI3KΥ) and, in a sustained body of work, defined its structure, explained its complex pattern of regulation by GβΥ and Ras, and proved its role in inflammatory events in vivo. They - in parallel with Dario Alessi - identified phosphoinositide-dependent kinase-1 as the PtdIns(3,4,5)P3-activated link between PI3K-1 activation and protein kinase B activation, a key pathway through which PtdIns(3,4,5)P3 formation regulates cell proliferation and survival.

Life

Phill Hawkins received a BSc in Biochemistry from the University of Bristol (1980) and a PhD in Biochemistry (1983) from the University of Birmingham. After a post-doctoral training in S.K. & F. Research Ltd, he joined the Molecular Neurobiology unit of the MRC in Cambridge (UK). He joined the AFRC IAPGR (now Babraham Institute) in 1990 and became a group leader in 2003.

Awards and recognition

Phill Hawkins has received several awards, including:

 2013, elected Fellow of the Royal Society of London

References

External links
 Phill Hawkins' group at the Babraham Institute

Academics of the University of Cambridge
British molecular biologists
Living people
1958 births
British immunologists
Alumni of the University of Bristol
Alumni of the University of Birmingham
Fellows of the Royal Society